The history of Philippine money covers currency in use before the Hispanic era with gold Piloncitos and other commodities in circulation, as well as the adoption of the peso during the Hispanic era and afterwards.

The Philippine peso is ultimately derived from the Spanish peso or pieces of eight brought over in large quantities by the Manila galleons of the 16th to 19th centuries. From the same Spanish peso or dollar is derived the various pesos of Latin America, the dollars of the US and Hong Kong, as well as the Chinese yuan and the Japanese yen.

History

Long before the Spaniards came to the Philippines in 1521, the Filipinos had established trade relations with neighboring lands like China, Java, Borneo, Thailand and other settlements. Barter was a system of trading commonly practiced throughout the world and adopted by the Philippines. The inconvenience of the barter system led to the adoption of a specific medium of exchange – the cowry shells. Cowries produced in gold, jade, quartz and wood became the most common and acceptable form of money through many centuries.

The Philippines is naturally rich in gold, making possible the availability of local gold coinage called piloncitos. The original silver currency unit was the rupee or rupiah (known locally as salapi), brought over by trade with India and Indonesia. The salapi continued under Spanish rule as a teston worth four reales or half a Spanish peso.

Early Philippine history (c. 900 AD–1565)

Piloncitos

Piloncitos were used in Tondo, Namayan and Rajahnate of Butuan in present-day Philippines. Piloncitos are tiny engraved bead-like gold bits unearthed in the Philippines. They are the first recognized coinage in the Philippines circulated between the 9th and 12th centuries. They emerged when increasing trade made barter inconvenient.

Piloncitos are so small—some are of the size of a corn kernel—and weigh from 0.09 to 2.65 grams of fine gold. Large Piloncitos weigh almost 1 mace, or 1/10th of a tael. Piloncitos have been excavated from Mandaluyong, Bataan, the banks of the Pasig River, Batangas, Marinduque, Samar, Leyte and some areas in Mindanao. They have been found in large numbers in Indonesian archeological sites leading to questions of origin. That gold was mined and worked here is evidenced by many Spanish accounts, like one in 1586 that said:

Barter rings

The early Filipinos also traded along with the Barter rings, which is gold ring-like ingots. These barter rings are bigger than a doughnut in size and are made of nearly pure gold.

Spanish era (1565–1898) 

The Spanish silver peso worth eight reales was first introduced by the Magellan expedition of 1521 and brought in large quantities by the Manila galleons after the 1565 conquest of the Philippines. See Spanish dollar. The local salapi continued under Spanish rule as a half-peso coin. Additionally, Spanish gold onzas or eight-escudo coins were also introduced with identical weight to the Spanish dollar but valued at 16 silver pesos.

Silver Cobs and Columnarios 

The earliest silver coins brought in by the galleons from Mexico and other Spanish colonies were in the form of roughly-cut cobs or macuquinas. These coins usually bore a cross on one side and the Spanish royal coat-of-arms on the other. Locals called these crudely-made coins "hilis-kalamay" due to its resemblance to flattened rice cakes. These were replaced starting 1726 by machine-minted coins called Columnarios (pillar dollars) or dos mundos (two worlds) containing 27.07 grams of 0.917 fine silver (revised to 0.903 fine in 1771).

These pillar dollars circulated extensively not only in the Philippines but all over the world in the 18th and 19th centuries due to its beauty of design, consistency of weight and fineness, universal recognition among merchants worldwide, and a serrated edge which prevented the clipping away of the precious metal. From the same Spanish peso or dollar is derived the various pesos of Latin America, the dollars of the US and Hong Kong, as well as the Chinese yuan and the Japanese yen.

Fractional currency and Cuartos 

Silver coins were minted in denominations of 8 real and 4, 2, 1 and  real. Gold coins came in denominations of 8 escudos and 4, 2, 1 and  escudos. Small change was also made by cutting a whole  coin, most commonly into eight wedges each worth one Spanish real.

Locally produced crude copper or bronze coins called cuartos or barrillas were also struck in the Philippines by order of the Spanish government. From this came the Filipino words “kwarta” (synonymous to money in general) and “barya” (small change). In 1837 an order was issued that 20 such cuartos be counted as one real (hence, 160 cuartos to a peso).

The discontinuation in the 19th century of officially minted copper cuartos was alleviated in part by counterfeit two-cuarto coins (worth 80 to a peso) made by Igorot copper miners in the Cordilleras and accepted in circulation by the rest of the country.

Stamped Philippine Currency 

In the early part of the 19th century, most of the Spanish colonies in Central and South America revolted and declared independence from Spain. They issued silver coins bearing revolutionary slogans and symbols which reached the Philippines. The Spanish government officials in the islands were fearful that the seditious markings would incite Filipinos to rebellion. Thus they removed the inscriptions by counter stamping the coins with the word F7 or YII.

A currency system derived from coins imported from Spain, China and neighboring countries was fraught with various difficulties. Money came in different coinages, and fractional currency in addition to the real and the cuarto also existed. Peso coins with Spanish or Mexican designs are also easily imported and exported overseas, occasionally emptying government and private coffers. Money has nearly always been scarce in Manila, and when it was abundant it was shipped to the provinces. An 1857 decree requiring the keeping of accounts in pesos and centimos (worth 1/100th of a peso) was of little help to the situation given the existence of copper cuartos worth 160 to a peso.

Philippine Gold / Silver Bimetallic Standard in the 19th century 

The Spanish gold onza (or 8-escudo coin) was of identical weight to the Spanish dollar but was officially valued at 16 silver pesos, thus putting the peso on a bimetallic standard with a gold/silver ratio of 16. Its divergence with the value of gold in international trade featured prominently in the continued monetary crises of the 19th century.

The California gold rush of 1848-1855 meant the gold onza, officially valued at 16 pesos, fetched only about 15 pesos internationally, and it in fact suffered as much as a 33% discount when paid to Chinese merchants who consistently count in silver pesos. As the Spanish government continued to receive these gold onzas as 16 pesos, there eventually came a time when silver pesos became scarce and only gold 16-peso coins remained in circulation.

In order to remedy this damage in the monetary situation, Queen Isabella II issued a decree in 1857 ordering the founding of the Casa de Moneda de Manila in the Philippines in order to coin gold 1, 2 and 4 peso coins according to Spanish standards (the 4-peso coin being 6.766 grams of 0.875 gold). The first gold coins were minted in 1861. In the same year a royal decree ordered the minting of 50, 20 and 10 centimo silver coins out of Latin American coins also according to Spanish standards (with 100 centimos containing 25.98 grams of 0.900 silver). The price of silver has since gone down and the first silver coins were minted in 1864.

The relative abundance of gold in the Philippines then came to an end with the adoption of the gold standard in most of Europe after 1871 and the subsequent climb in the international gold/silver ratio above 16. It was further aggravated by an 1876 decree confirming the Mexican peso as legal tender in the Philippines and exchangeable with the gold onza for 16 pesos. The climb in the gold onza's overseas value above 16 pesos soon made importing Mexican dollars in exchange for gold coins a profitable venture. While the Governor General attempted in 1877 to stem the outflow of gold by limiting the legal tender status of Mexican silver, by 1884 gold coin had entirely disappeared.

The 19th century therefore ended with the Philippine peso still officially on a bimetallic standard equal to either the silver Mexican peso (weighing 27.07 grams 0.903 fine, or 0.786 troy ounce XAG) or 1/16th the gold onza (weighing 1.6915 gram 0.875 fine, or 0.0476 troy ounce XAU). The gold peso, however, has since increased in value to approx. two silver pesos. Furthermore, the fineness of Philippine fractional silver coins was reduced from 0.900 to 0.835 and worsened the quality of the local currency, and the introduction of Alfonsino silver coins in 1897 did little to improve the peso's exchange value. Such Mexican and Spanish-Filipino coins remained in circulation until they were demonetized after the introduction of the new US-Philippine peso in 1903.

Peso Fuerte Banknotes 

The first paper money circulated in the Philippines was the Philippine peso fuerte issued in 1851 by the country's first bank, the El Banco Español Filipino de Isabel II. Being bimetallic and convertible to either silver pesos or gold onzas, its volume of 1,800,000 pesos was small relative to about 40,000,000 silver pesos in circulation at the end of the 19th century.

Sulu coins
The Sultanate of Sulu in the southernmost islands engaged actively in barter trade with the Arabs, Han Chinese, Bornean, Moluccan, and British traders. The Sultans issued coins of their own as early as the 5th century. Coins of Sultan Azimud Din that exist today are of base metal Tin, Silver and alloy bearing Arabic inscriptions and dated 1148 AH corresponding to the year 1735 in the Christian era.

First Philippine Republic (Revolutionary period 1898–1899)

The Philippine Republic of 1898 under General Emilio Aguinaldo issued currency backed by the country's natural resources. Two types of two-centavo copper coins were struck at the Malolos arsenal and one and two peso paper notes hand signed by Pedro Paterno, Mariano Limjap and Telesforo Chuidian were printed and freely circulated. These were withdrawn from circulation and declared illegal currency after the surrender of General Aguinaldo to the Americans.

American colonial period (1901–1946)

After the United States took control of the Philippines, the United States Congress passed the Philippine Coinage Act of 1903, established the unit of currency to be a theoretical gold peso (not coined) consisting of 12.9 grains of gold 0.900 fine (0.0241875 XAU), equivalent to ₱2,640 as of December 22, 2010. This unit was equivalent to exactly half the value of a U.S. dollar. Its peg to gold was maintained until the gold content of the US dollar was reduced in 1934. Its peg of ₱2 to the US dollar was maintained until independence in 1946.

The act provided for the coinage and issuance of Philippine silver pesos substantially of the weight and fineness as the Mexican peso, which should be of the value of 50 cents gold and redeemable in gold at the insular treasury, and which was intended to be the sole circulating medium among the people. The act also provided for the coinage of subsidiary and minor coins and for the issuance of silver certificates in denominations of not less than 2 nor more than 10 pesos (maximum denomination increased to 500 pesos in 1906).

It also provided for the creation of a gold-standard fund to maintain the parity of the coins so authorized to be issued and authorized the insular government to issue temporary certificates of indebtedness bearing interest at a rate not to exceed 4 per cent per annum, payable not more than one year from date of issue, to an amount which should not at any one time exceed 10 million dollars or 20 million pesos.

Commonwealth period (1935–1946)

When the Philippines became a U.S. Commonwealth in 1935, the coat of arms of the Philippine Commonwealth were adopted and replaced the arms of the US Territories on the reverse of coins while the obverse remained unchanged. This seal is composed of a much smaller eagle with its wings pointed up, perched over a shield with peaked corners, above a scroll reading "Commonwealth of the Philippines". It is a much busier pattern, and widely considered less attractive.

The "Mickey Mouse money" (Fiat peso)

During World War II in the Philippines, the occupying Japanese government-issued fiat currency in several denominations; this is known as the Japanese government-issued Philippine fiat peso (see also Japanese invasion money). The Second Philippine Republic under José P. Laurel outlawed possession of guerrilla currency, and declared a monopoly on the issuance of money, so that anyone found to possess guerrilla notes could be arrested. Some Filipinos called the fiat peso "Mickey Mouse money". Many survivors of the war  tell stories of going to the market laden with suitcases or "bayóng" (native bags made of woven coconut or buri leaf strips) overflowing with the Japanese-issued bills. According to one witness, 75 "Mickey Mouse" pesos, or about 35 U.S. dollars at that time, could buy one duck egg. In 1944, a box of matches cost more than 100 Mickey Mouse pesos.

"Guerilla Pesos" (Emergency circulating notes)

The Emergency circulating notes were currency printed by the Philippine Commonwealth Government in exile during World War II. These "guerrilla pesos" were printed by local government units and banks using crude inks and materials. Due to the inferior quality of these bills, they were easily mutilated. The Japanese-sponsored Second Philippine Republic under President José P. Laurel outlawed possession of guerrilla currency and declared a monopoly on the issuance of money and anyone found to possess guerrilla notes could be arrested or even executed.

Modern currencies (1946–present)

English Series

The English Series were Philippine banknotes that circulated from 1951 to 1971. It was the only banknote series of the Philippine peso to use English as its language.

Pilipino series
The Pilipino series banknotes is the name used to refer to Philippine banknotes issued by the Central Bank of the Philippines from 1969 to 1973, during the term of President Ferdinand Marcos. It was succeeded by the Ang Bagong Lipunan Series of banknotes, to which it shared a similar design. The lowest denomination of the series is 1-piso and the highest is 100-piso. This series represented a radical change from the English series. The bills underwent Filipinization and a design change. After the declaration of Proclamation № 1081 on September 23, 1972, the Central Bank demonetized the existing banknotes (both the English and Pilipino series) on March 1, 1974, pursuant to Presidential Decree No. 378. All the unissued banknotes were sent back to the De La Rue plant in London for overprinting the watermark area with the words "ANG BAGONG LIPUNAN" and an oval geometric safety design.

Ang Bagong Lipunan series
The Ang Bagong Lipunan Series (literally, ”The New Society Series") is the name used to refer to Philippine banknotes issued by the Central Bank of the Philippines from 1973 to 1985. It was succeeded by the New Design series of banknotes. The lowest denomination of the series is 2-piso and the highest is 100-piso.
After the declaration of Proclamation № 1081 by President Ferdinand Marcos on September 23, 1972, the Central Bank was to demonetize the existing banknotes in 1974, pursuant to Presidential Decree 378. All the unissued Pilipino Series banknotes (except the one peso banknote) were sent back to the De La Rue plant in London for overprinting the watermark area with the words "ANG BAGONG LIPUNAN" and an oval geometric safety design. The one peso note was replaced with the two peso note, which features the same elements of the demonetized "Pilipino" series one peso note.
On September 7, 1978, the Security Printing Plant in Quezon City was inaugurated to produce the banknotes. And a minor change of its BSP seal.

New Design Series

The New Design Series (NDS) was the name used to refer to banknotes of the Philippine peso issued from 1985 to 2013; it was also known as the BSP Series when the Bangko Sentral ng Pilipinas was established in 1993. It was succeeded by the New Generation Currency (NGC) Series issued on December 16, 2010. The NDS/BSP banknotes were printed until 2013 (with 5-peso note were printed until 1995, 10-peso note until 2001, 20 and 1000 peso notes until 2012, and 50, 100, 200 and 500 peso notes until 2013) and legal tender until December 31, 2015, where they coexisted with the NGC banknotes from December 16, 2010, to December 31, 2015.

The NDS/BSP notes were no longer legal tender since January 1, 2016, but can be exchanged with NGC notes until its demonetization on December 29, 2017 (with the demonetization of the NDS/BSP notes were originally scheduled by January 1, 2017, but the deadline of exchange of NDS/BSP notes to NGC notes was extended to July 1, 2017, after the Bangko Sentral ng Pilipinas approved the extension due to public clamor, and extended again to the final demonetization date of NDS/BSP series notes on December 29, 2017, after BSP decided to extend its time limit due to Filipino consumers presenting the notes after that date).

New Generation Currency (current)

In 2009, Bangko Sentral ng Pilipinas (BSP) announced that it has launched a massive redesign for current banknotes and coins to further enhance security features and improve durability. The members of the numismatic committee include BSP Deputy Governor Diwa Guinigundo and Ambeth Ocampo, Chairman of the National Historical Institute. The new banknote designs feature famous Filipinos and iconic natural wonders. Philippine national symbols will be depicted on coins. The BSP started releasing the initial batch of new banknotes on December 16, 2010.

References

Bibliography

 Banknotes and Coins June 2010, Bangko Sentral ng Pilipinas (BSP).
 Philippine Coins'' at the Bohol.ph website

External links

 Virtual Museum of Spanish Philippine Coinage
 Philippine Guerrilla and Emergency Notes
 Philippine Coin News & Update
 Philippine Banknotes and Coins

Philippines currency history
Banknotes of the Philippines
Currencies of the Philippines
Economy of the Philippines
History of money